This is a list of companies whose British or regional headquarters are located in Newcastle upon Tyne or in nearby North Tyneside.

1DayLater
AkzoNobel
Be-Ro
Bellway
Fenwick
Formica Corporation
Go-Ahead Group
Goldsmiths
Greggs
Newcastle Building Society
Palringo
Parkdean Holidays
Reid & Sons
Tapirs Technologies
The Sage Group
Virgin Money UK
Tommee Tippee
Baltic Apprenticeships

Companies with other bases of significant importance in Newcastle and North Tyneside
Accenture (Cobalt Business Park)
BAE Systems (Vickers Armstrong works, Scotswood Road)
British Airways (offices in Benwell and Scotswood)
CloudARM (IT Consultancy)
Convergys (main UK site in Quorum Business Park, circa 800 employees)
Department for Work and Pensions
Eutechnyx
Inland Revenue (National Insurance Contributions Office)
EE (offices/call centre in Wallsend)
Npower
Ubisoft (Ubisoft Reflections studio)
DXC Technology
]

Economy of Tyne and Wear
Newcastle upon Tyne
Companies